Pontus Nordenberg (born 16 February 1995) is a Swedish footballer who plays for Nyköpings BIS as a defender.

References

External links

1995 births
Living people
Association football defenders
Åtvidabergs FF players
Ungmennafélagið Víkingur players
Nyköpings BIS players
Swedish footballers
Sweden youth international footballers
Sweden under-21 international footballers
Allsvenskan players